Charles Wellesley (November 17, 1873 – July 24, 1946) was an Irish-born American actor of the silent era. He appeared in more than 80 films between 1913 and 1928. He was born in Dublin and died in Amityville, New York.

Partial filmography

 My Official Wife (1914)
 The Battle of Frenchman's Run (1915)
 Hearts and the Highway (1915)
 The Hero of Submarine D-2 (1916)
 The Enemy (1916)
 The Poor Little Rich Girl (1917)
 Redemption (1917)
 Her Better Self (1917)
 Richard the Brazen (1917)
 Wrath (1917)
 By Right of Purchase (1918)
 Madame Jealousy (1918)
 The Heart of a Girl (1918)
 The Song of Songs (1918)
 The Purple Lily (1918)
 Nobody (1921)
 His Greatest Sacrifice (1921)
 It Isn't Being Done This Season (1921) 
 Outcast (1922)
 The Rapids (1922)
 Legally Dead (1923)
 Alias the Night Wind (1923)
 Don't Marry for Money (1923)
 The Acquittal (1923)
 Enemies of Children (1923)
 The Wolf Man (1924)
 Cytherea (1924)
 Traffic in Hearts (1924)
 The Perfect Flapper (1924)
 The Lost World (1925)
 The Half-Way Girl (1925)
 The Unholy Three (1925) (uncredited)
 College Days (1926)
 Sinews of Steel (1927)
 The Stolen Bride (1927)
 Skinner's Big Idea (1928)

References

External links

1873 births
1946 deaths
Male actors from Dublin (city)
American male film actors
American male silent film actors
20th-century American male actors
Irish emigrants to the United States (before 1923)